Stardust is a non-fiction collection of memoirs and essays, written by Canadian writer Bruce Serafin, first published in October 2007 by New Star Books. The book, contains 20 writings from Serafin's youth; compiled after the authors death in 2007. Primarily the prose dishes harsh criticism at the establishment; in the authors style of candid and frank discourse. Serafin was honored posthumously for his work.

Awards and honours
Stardust received the 2008 "Edna Staebler Award for Creative Non-Fiction".

See also
List of Edna Staebler Award recipients

References

Canadian memoirs
Canadian non-fiction books
2007 non-fiction books